Tabebuia elongata is a species of plant in the family Bignoniaceae. It is endemic to Cuba.

References

Flora of Cuba
elongata
Endangered plants
Taxonomy articles created by Polbot